Supply ship may refer to:

 Auxiliary ship
 Cargo spacecraft
 Platform supply vessel, to supply offshore oil platforms
 Replenishment oiler

See also
 HMS Supply
 HMAS Supply
 USS Supply